Sacred and Profane, Op. 91, is a collection of 'Eight Medieval Lyrics' for unaccompanied voices in five parts (SSATB) composed by Benjamin Britten in 1975.

The work was first performed by the Wilbye Consort of Voices, for whom the work was composed, on 14 September 1975 at The Maltings, Snape in Suffolk, England (Elaine Barry & Rosemary Hardy, sopranos, Margaret Cable, contralto, Nigel Rogers, tenor, Geoffrey Shaw, bass), directed by Peter Pears.

Structure
The piece comprises eight lyrics based on medieval English poems.
St Godric's Hymn
I mon waxe wod ("Foweles in the frith")
Lenten is come
The long night
Yif ic of luve can
Carol
Ye that pasen by
A Death

Music
The opening song is characterized by its use of descending glissandi, rising chords, and modal inflection. The second, "I mon waxe wod", correlates nature with madness. The third setting uses syncopation and imitation to celebrate the arrival of spring, while the fourth returns to sombre winter. The fifth and seventh songs are based on the Passion, and contrast with the "folksy" sixth setting. The collection concludes with its longest piece, which as the title suggests deals with themes of mortality.

References

External links 
 
 Sacred and Profane (1975) Faber Music
 Mervyn Cooke: Sacred and Profane, Op. 91 Hyperion Records 2001

Compositions by Benjamin Britten
Choral compositions
1975 compositions